The Asahi Top Eight Players was a Go competition.

Outline
The final was a best-of-three match. This tournament was short-lived, being played only one year.

Past winners

External links
 The Asahi Top Eight Tournament

Go competitions in Japan